A High Flux Reactor is a type of nuclear research reactor.

 High Flux Isotope Reactor (HFIR), in Oak Ridge, Tennessee, United States of America,
 High Flux Australian Reactor (HIFAR), Australia's first nuclear reactor,
 High-Flux Advanced Neutron Application Reactor (HANARO), in South Korea.
 The High Flux Reactor at Institut Laue–Langevin in France.
 High Flux Reactor (HFR) at Petten in the Netherlands

Nuclear research reactors